Billy Knight defeated Ramanathan Krishnan in the final, 7–5, 6–4 to win the boys' singles tennis title at the 1953 Wimbledon Championships.

Draw

Draw

References

External links

Boys' Singles
Wimbledon Championship by year – Boys' singles